Shirley May France (August 11, 1932 – March 18, 2012) was, at the time, the youngest woman to attempt to swim the English Channel, although her three attempts in 1949 and 1950 were unsuccessful. She was born in Fall River, Massachusetts. She was the first woman to swim across Lake George in the U.S. states of New York and Vermont. She lived in Somerset, Massachusetts, and had five children. She died in 2012.

References

External links

British Pathe – Shirley May France 

American female swimmers
1932 births
2012 deaths
People from Somerset, Massachusetts
20th-century American women